Kudashevo (Qoźaş) is a rural locality (a village) in Kushmanakovsky Selsoviet, Burayevsky District, Bashkortostan, Russia. The population was 409 as of 2010. There are 10 streets.

Geography 
Kudashevo is located 10 km west of Burayevo (the district's administrative centre) by road. Tugayevo is the nearest rural locality.

References 

Rural localities in Burayevsky District